Eben Pomeroy Colton (February 11, 1829 – September 10, 1895) was an American businessman and farmer who served as the 32nd lieutenant governor of Vermont from 1878 to 1880.

Personal background 
Born Ebenezer Pomeroy Colton and usually called E. Pomeroy Colton or E. P. Colton, he was born in West Fairlee, Vermont on February 11, 1829, the son of John and Phoebe (Morey) Colton. He moved to Irasburg with his family at age 14, and after completing his education was active in construction, carpentry, farming and lumbering.

Political background 
Originally a Whig in politics, Colton became a Republican when that party was founded in the 1850s. He served in the Vermont House of Representatives from 1859 to 1860 and in the Vermont Senate from 1870 to 1874. In 1876, he was again elected to the Vermont House.

In 1878, Colton was elected Lieutenant Governor and served one term, 1878 to 1880.

Active in the Masons and other civic and fraternal organizations, Colton was the first Master of the Vermont Grange, serving from 1872 to 1877.

Colton died in Irasburg on September 10, 1895.  He is buried in Irasburg Cemetery.

References

1829 births
1895 deaths
Lieutenant Governors of Vermont
Vermont state senators
Members of the Vermont House of Representatives
People from Orleans County, Vermont
Vermont Whigs
19th-century American politicians
Vermont Republicans
Burials in Vermont